Hellinsia contortus is a moth of the family Pterophoridae that is found in North America, including Arizona.

The forewings are dull whitish with a broad pale yellowish area extending along the costa and occupying most of the first lobe. The hindwings are pale smoky.

References

contortus
Endemic fauna of the United States
Moths of North America
Fauna of the Southwestern United States
Natural history of Arizona
Moths described in 1938